May Margaret Beenken (22 October 1901, Philadelphia, Pennsylvania – 21 December 1988, St. Vincent Medical Center (Los Angeles)) was an American mathematician.

Life 

Beenken was born in Philadelphia, Pennsylvania. Her parents were Sophie Kirn (1862 – 1941) and Henry Beenken (b. 1852). and she had at least three older siblings.

Career 

Beenken completed her PhD at the University of Chicago in 1928. Her doctoral advisor was Ernest Preston Lane and her thesis was titled Surfaces in Five-Dimensional Space. She later became an instructor at Oshkosh Teacher's College. She also served as a lecturer at the University of California, Los Angeles in 1945, as well as an associate professor (later professor) at Immaculate Heart College from 1947 to 1969.

Personal life 
After retiring, "she decided to turn to painting" and "applied herself here with the same single-mindedness as in teaching", according to a former colleague and student of hers.

References 

1901 births
1988 deaths
American women mathematicians
20th-century American mathematicians
University of Chicago alumni
20th-century women mathematicians
20th-century American women